Missisquoi was a federal electoral district in Quebec, Canada, that was represented in the House of Commons of Canada from 1867 to  1925.

History

It was created as a riding by the British North America Act, 1867. Missisquoi consisted initially of the County of Missiquoi.

In 1892, it was defined as consisting of the parishes of St. Thomas de Foucault, St. George de Clarenceville (including the village of Clarenceville), St. Armand East (including the village of Frelighsburg), St. Armand West (including the village of Philipsburg), and St. Ignace de Stanbridge; the township of Stanbridge; the town of Bedford; the municipality of Stanbridge Station; the township of Dunham (including the villages of Dunham, Cowansville and Sweetsburg); the west part of the township of Farnham; the town of Farnham; the parish of Lacolle, together with the islands situated in the river Richelieu opposite the parish of Lacolle.

In 1903, the parish of Lacolle, together with the islands situated in the river Richelieu opposite thereto, were transferred to the electoral district of St. Johns—Iberville. The parishes of Notre Dame de Stanbridge and Notre Dame des Anges de Stanbridge were transferred from St. Johns and Iberville to Missisquoi.

It was abolished in 1924 when it was merged into Brome—Missisquoi riding.

The histories of two later Missiquoi ridings are covered in the Brome—Missisquoi article:
Missisquoi riding was re-created in 1966 from parts of Brome—Missisquoi, Saint-Jean—Iberville—Napierville and Stanstead ridings, but was renamed "Brome—Missisquoi" in 1970.
A third Missisquoi riding was created in 1976 from Brome—Missisquoi, but was renamed "Brome—Missiquoi" in 1983.

Members of Parliament

This riding elected the following Members of Parliament:

Election results

By-election: On Mr. Chamberlin's resignation to become Queen's Printer, 7 June 1870

By-election: On Mr. Clayes' death, 3 March 1888

|-

|-

See also 

 List of Canadian federal electoral districts
 Past Canadian electoral districts

References

External links
Riding history for Missisquoi 1867-1925 from the Library of Parliament

Former federal electoral districts of Quebec